All Saints Anglican Church is an Anglican church in the Diocese of Sydney. The church is located at 325 Stanmore Road, Petersham, New South Wales, Australia.

History 
The first church service was held in Petersham on 15 April 1860 in a tiny school room.  Shortly thereafter, the congregation resolved to build a school and hall. The old school room no longer exists.

Church building 
In 1870 the parish decided to build a proper church.  The site for the church was bequeathed to the Church by the late Mrs. Priddle, sister of Dr. Wardell, an early settler in Petersham. Building commenced and the foundation stone of the present building was laid on 17 December 1870.

Nearly a year elapsed before the eastern end of the building was finished. The opening service was held on All Saints' Day, 1 November 1871. The cost of the church was £1,927.

The western end of the building was commenced in 1879 and completed in 1880. The re-opening service was held on 11 September 1880.

The church vestry was built in 1886. In the same year, a pipe organ built by A. Hunter & Son of Clapham, England was installed at a cost of £750. The organ was converted from a water motor to an electric motor in 1911.

On 11 February 1974, the National Trust of Australia (NSW) included the church building in the Trust's register of Historic Buildings. It is also listed on the local government heritage register.

A memorial stone was laid by the Governor of New South Wales, Sir Roden Cutler on 1 November 1970 to commemorate 100 years of service to Petersham.

Prominent members of Ministry 
 Rev HA Palmer foundation rector
 Rev C Barber
 Can RE Goddard
 Rev PJ Bazeley
 Rev CE Adams
 Rev RA Johnson
 Rev T E Chamion
The current senior minister is Rev Benjamin Gray

Notable parishioners 
 Charles Arthur Jarman, notable organist and composer.

See also 

 Australian non-residential architectural styles
 List of Anglican churches in the Diocese of Sydney

References

Bibliography 
 E. E. Quelch, "All Saints’ Church of England, Petersham, 1870-1970",

External links 
 Church website
 Anglican Diocese of Sydney
 NSW Heritage Council database record

1871 establishments in Australia
Anglican church buildings in Sydney
Anglican Diocese of Sydney
Gothic Revival architecture in Sydney
Gothic Revival church buildings in Australia
Petersham, New South Wales
Churches completed in 1871